Isabel Dawn (born Isabel Lydia Seitz; October 20, 1897 – June 29, 1966) was an American screenwriter, actress, and journalist active primarily in the 1930s and 1940s.

Biography 
Born in Evansville, Indiana, to John Seitz and Viola Wright, Isabel worked at newspapers like The Evansville Courier and The Kokomo Dispatch and attended Valparaiso University before moving to New York City. Around this time, she married her first husband, Thomas Goss.

While in New York City, she and a fellow playwright were hit by a taxi; she spent a good deal of time in the hospital recovering. Her writing partner did not make it.

She appeared in a number of stage plays, radio plays, and films in New York and Los Angeles prior to her 1934 marriage to screenwriter Boyce DeGaw. She and DeGaw collaborated on a number of scripts together before divorcing around 1941. She later married Ray Herr.

Many of her screenplays were written for Republic Pictures; she frequently worked with director Joseph Santley.

She died in Woodland Hills, California, at the age of 66.

Selected filmography 

 Give and Take (1946)
 Goodnight, Sweetheart (1944)
 Remember Pearl Harbor (1942)
Yokel Boy (1942) (aka Hitting the Headlines)
 A Tragedy at Midnight (1942)
 Doctors Don't Tell (1941)
 A Man Betrayed (1941)
 Behind the News (1940)
 The Girl of the Golden West (1938)
 Wings Over Honolulu (1937)
 The Moon's Our Home (1936)
 Don't Bet on Blondes (1935)
 If I Had a Million (1932)

References

1897 births
1966 deaths
20th-century American actresses
American women journalists
Actresses from Indiana
Journalists from Indiana
Screenwriters from Indiana
American women screenwriters
Valparaiso University alumni
20th-century American women writers
20th-century American screenwriters
20th-century American journalists